John Halifax, Gentleman is a novel by Dinah Craik, first published in 1856.

The novel was adapted for BBC Radio 4 in 1970 and on television on BBC in 1974.

Plot summary
The action is centred on the town of Tewkesbury, scarcely disguised by the fictional name Norton Bury, in Gloucestershire.  The story is narrated by Phineas, a friend of the central character. John Halifax is an orphan, determined to make his way in the world through honest hard work. He is taken in by a tanner, Abel Fletcher, who is a Quaker, and thus meets Phineas, who is Abel's son.  John eventually achieves success in business and love, and becomes a wealthy man.

A photographic postcard, probably from the early 20th century, depicts Dunkirk Mills, Inchbrook, near Nailsworth and Stroud, Gloucestershire, stating it was the "original Mills of 'John Halifax Gentleman'".

A discussion on a Stroud Fakebook [sic] page suggests that Enderley and the cottage were modelled on an area near Avening.

Editions 

An illustrated edition was published by J. M. Dent & Co. in 1898, with twelve colour plates by three artists: W. C. (Cubitt) Cooke. L. M. (Laura) Fisher and F. C. (Frederick Colin) Tilney.

Adaptations
The novel has been adapted several times. A 1915 silent film John Halifax, Gentleman was directed by George Pearson. In 1938 a film version John Halifax was made. In 1974 a BBC series John Halifax, Gentleman was made.

In popular culture 
The book is mentioned in Agatha Christie's 1935 novel Why Didn't They Ask Evans?.

References

External links

John Halifax, Gentleman at A Celebration of Women Writers

1856 British novels
Novels set in Gloucestershire
Tewkesbury
British novels adapted into films